Simon Belither (born 1957) is a British former sports shooter.

Sports shooting career
Belither represented England and won a gold medal in the fullbore rifle pairs with Andrew Tucker, at the 1990 Commonwealth Games in Auckland, New Zealand.

References

1957 births
Living people
British male sport shooters
Shooters at the 1990 Commonwealth Games
Commonwealth Games medallists in shooting
Commonwealth Games gold medallists for England
20th-century British people
Medallists at the 1990 Commonwealth Games